Microporus is a genus of burrowing bugs in the family Cydnidae. There are at least four described species in Microporus.

Species
These four species belong to the genus Microporus:
 Microporus nigrita (Fabricius, 1794) (black ground bug)
 Microporus obliquus Uhler, 1872
 Microporus shiromai Froeschner, 1977
 Microporus testudinatus Uhler, 1876

References

Further reading

External links

 

Cydnidae